Nationalist Left (EN, Esquerda Nacionalista in Galician language) was a Galician political party formed in 1992. The party had about 600 members in 2002. EN was part of the Galician Nationalist Bloc (BNG) from its foundation to February 2012. On April 14, 2012, the organization was dissolved and its members joined the Máis Galiza party.

History and characteristics
EN advocated for the independence of Galiza and the gradual reintegration of Galician and Portuguese. EN supported "Yes" in the referendum on the Treaty of the European Constitution, despite the fact that the BNG supported "No". The top party organs are the National Executive and the National Bureau.

In sixth National Assembly, held in Santiago de Compostela on 30 March 2008, Xosé Chorén and Alberte Xullo Rodríguez Feixoo were elected as the National Secretary and the Party president respectively. However, some of the party did not recognize the VI National Assembly, including Nationalist Left - Youth. Due to this, Nationalist Left - Youth split from the party along with some senior militants, going on to found a new party, the Galician Socialist Space.

En Galiza was its official magazine and EN promoted the Enclave Foundation.

References

 Beramendi, X.G. (2007): De provincia a nación. Historia do galeguismo político. Xerais, Vigo
 Beramendi, X.G. and Núñez Seixas, X.M. (1996): O nacionalismo galego. A Nosa Terra, Vigo

Defunct socialist parties in Galicia (Spain)
Former member parties of the Galician Nationalist Bloc
Galician nationalist parties
Left-wing nationalist parties